The 2022–23 San Antonio Spurs season is the 56th season of the franchise, its 47th in the National Basketball Association (NBA), and its 50th in the San Antonio area.

On March 7, 2023, the Spurs were eliminated from playoff contention with the Thunder’s win over the Warriors and the Mavericks’ win over the Jazz.

Draft

The Spurs held three first-round picks and one second-round pick entering the draft.

Roster

Standings

Division

Conference

Game log

Preseason

|- style="background:#fcc;"
| 1
| October 2
| @ Houston
| 
| Devin Vassell (13)
| Jakob Pöltl (10)
| Collins, Wesley (4)
| Toyota Center10,640
| 0–1
|-style="background:#fcc;
| 2
| October 6
| Orlando
| 
| Doug McDermott (14)
| Pöltl, Roby (6)
| Devin Vassell (5)
| AT&T Center11,561
| 0–2
|-style="background:#fcc;
| 3
| October 9
| New Orleans
| 
| Doug McDermott (14)
| Gorgui Dieng (9)
| Gorgui Dieng (4)
| AT&T Center18,193
| 0–3
|-style="background:#cfc;
| 4
| October 10
| @ Utah
| 
| Devin Vassell (24)
| Bates-Diop, Dieng, Johnson, Pöltl (5)
| Jakob Pöltl (5)
| Vivint Arena13,887
| 1–3
|-style="background:#fcc;
| 5
| October 13
| Oklahoma City
| 
| Joshua Primo (23)
| Jakob Pöltl (10)
| Jakob Pöltl (5)
| AT&T Center13,836
| 1–4

Regular season

|-style="background:#fcc;
| 1
| October 19
| Charlotte
| 
| Keldon Johnson (20)
| Keldon Johnson (11)
| Joshua Primo (5)
| AT&T Center16,236
| 0–1
|- style="background:#cfc;"
| 2
| October 21
| @ Indiana
| 
| Josh Richardson (27)
| Jakob Pöltl (8)
| Joshua Primo (7)
| Gainbridge Fieldhouse12,073
| 1–1
|-style="background:#cfc;"
| 3
| October 22
| @ Philadelphia
| 
| Devin Vassell (22)
| Jakob Pöltl (11)
| Gorgui Dieng (5)
| Wells Fargo Center19,822
| 2–1
|-  style="background:#cfc;"
| 4
| October 24
| @ Minnesota
| 
| Devin Vassell (23)
| Jakob Pöltl (14)
| Tre Jones (8)
| Target Center15,347
| 3–1
|-  style="background:#fcc;"
| 5
| October 26
| @ Minnesota
| 
| Keldon Johnson (27)
| Jakob Pöltl (10)
| Josh Richardson (10)
| Target Center16,165
| 3–2
|- style="background:#cfc;"
| 6
| October 28
| Chicago
| 
| Keldon Johnson (33)
| Jakob Pöltl (13)
| Tre Jones (8)
| AT&T Center16,562
| 4–2
|-  style="background:#cfc;"
| 7
| October 30
| Minnesota
| 
| Keldon Johnson (25)
| Jakob Pöltl (14)
| Johnson, Jones (8)
| AT&T Center15,053
| 5–2

|-  style="background:#fcc;"
| 8
| November 2
| Toronto
| 
| Keita Bates-Diop (17)
| Collins, Jones (8)
| Tre Jones (7)
| AT&T Center12,155
| 5–3
|-  style="background:#fcc;"
| 9
| November 4
| L.A. Clippers
| 
| Devin Vassell (29)
| Johnson, Pöltl (7)
| Tre Jones (6)
| AT&T Center12,603
| 5–4
|- style="background:#fcc"
| 10
| November 5
| @ Denver
| 
| Keldon Johnson (25)
| Jakob Pöltl (8)
| Jakob Pöltl (7)
| Ball Arena19,641
| 5–5
|- style="background:#fcc;"
| 11
| November 7
| Denver
| 
| Keldon Johnson (30)
| Charles Bassey (8)
| Jones, Pöltl (9)
| AT&T Center11,574
| 5–6
|- style="background:#fcc;"
| 12
| November 9
| Memphis
| 
| Pöltl, Vassell (22)
| Jakob Pöltl (9)
| Tre Jones (11)
| AT&T Center13,507
| 5–7
|-  style="background:#cfc;"
| 13
| November 11
| Milwaukee
| 
| Keldon Johnson (29)
| Jakob Pöltl (10)
| Tre Jones (9)
| AT&T Center15,642
| 6–7
|-  style="background:#fcc;"
| 14
| November 14
| @ Golden State
| 
| Keldon Johnson (15)
| Jakob Pöltl (10)
| Bassey, Hall, Richardson, Roby (3)
| Chase Center18,064
| 6–8
|-  style="background:#fcc;"
| 15
| November 15
| @ Portland
| 
| Jakob Pöltl (31)
| Jakob Pöltl (14)
| Tre Jones (10)
| Moda Center19,012
| 6–9
|- style="background:#fcc;"
| 16
| November 17
| @ Sacramento
| 
| Devin Vassell (29)
| Jakob Pöltl (7)
| Jeremy Sochan (5)
| Golden 1 Center16,522
| 6–10
|- style="background:#fcc;"
| 17
| November 19
| @ L.A. Clippers
| 
| Jakob Pöltl (20)
| Charles Bassey (9)
| Tre Jones (10)
| Crypto.com Arena18,581
| 6–11
|-  style="background:#fcc;"
| 18
| November 20
| @ L.A. Lakers
| 
| Devin Vassell (17)
| Charles Bassey (8)
| Charles Bassey (5)
| Crypto.com Arena18,211
| 6–12
|-style="background:#fcc;"
| 19
| November 23
| New Orleans
| 
| Devin Vassell (26)
| Jakob Pöltl (14)
| Tre Jones (9)
| AT&T Center14,947
| 6–13
|-  style="background:#fcc;"
| 20
| November 25
| L.A. Lakers
| 
| Tre Jones (19)
| Johnson, Sochan (9)
| Jones, Sochan (5)
| AT&T Center18,354
| 6–14
|-style="background:#fcc;"
| 21
| November 26
| L.A. Lakers
| 
| Keldon Johnson (26)
| Keldon Johnson (10)
| Tre Jones (13)
| AT&T Center18,354
| 6–15
|-  style="background:#fcc;"
| 22
| November 30
| @ Oklahoma City
| 
| Devin Vassell (25)
| Romeo Langford (8)
| Keldon Johnson (6)
| Paycom Center15,605
| 6–16

|- style="background:#fcc;"
| 23
| December 2
| New Orleans
| 
| Devin Vassell (25)
| Charles Bassey (9)
| Tre Jones (9)
| AT&T Center17,202
| 6–17
|- style="background:#fcc;"
| 24
| December 4
| Phoenix
| 
| Keldon Johnson (27)
| Charles Bassey (7)
| Zach Collins (5)
| AT&T Center16,409
| 6–18
|- style="background:#cfc;"
| 25
| December 8
| Houston
| 
| Keldon Johnson (32)
| Keldon Johnson (7)
| Jones, Langford (5)
| AT&T Center13,140
| 7–18
|-  style="background:#cfc;"
| 26
| December 10
| @ Miami
| 
| Keldon Johnson (21)
| Zach Collins (8)
| Josh Richardson (6)
| FTX Arena19,600
| 8–18
|-  style="background:#cfc;"
| 27
| December 12
| Cleveland
| 
| Josh Richardson (24)
| Charles Bassey (11)
| Collins, Jones (5)
| AT&T Center13,434
| 9–18
|-  style="background:#fcc;"
| 28
| December 14
| Portland
| 
| Keldon Johnson (25)
| Gorgui Dieng (8)
| Tre Jones (6)
| AT&T Center13,657
| 9–19
|-  style="background:#fcc;"
| 29
| December 17
| Miami
| 
| Keldon Johnson (22)
| Jakob Pöltl (7)
| Tre Jones (9)
| Mexico City Arena20,160
| 9–20
|-  style="background:#cfc;"
| 30
| December 19
| @ Houston
| 
| Devin Vassell (26)
| Collins, Sochan (7)
| Tre Jones (8)
| Toyota Center15,928
| 10–20
|-  style="background:#fcc;"
| 31
| December 22
| @ New Orleans
| 
| Jeremy Sochan (23)
| Sochan, Vassell (9)
| Jeremy Sochan (6)
| Smoothie King Center16,417
| 10–21
|-  style="background:#fcc;"
| 32
| December 23
| @ Orlando
| 
| Keldon Johnson (17)
| Jeremy Sochan (9)
| Tre Jones (8)
| Amway Center18,425
| 10–22
|-  style="background:#cfc;"
| 33
| December 26
| Utah
| 
| Devin Vassell (24)
| Jakob Pöltl (9)
| Devin Vassell (8)
| AT&T Center16,351
| 11–22
|-  style="background:#fcc;"
| 34
| December 27
| @ Oklahoma City
| 
| Devin Vassell (20)
| Jeremy Sochan (9)
| Tre Jones (5)
| Paycom Center16,229
| 11–23
|-  style="background:#cfc;"
| 35
| December 29
| New York
| 
| Keldon Johnson (30)
| Jakob Pöltl (12)
| Tre Jones (6)
| AT&T Center18,354
| 12–23
|-  style="background:#fcc;"
| 36
| December 31
| Dallas
| 
| Keldon Johnson (30)
| Jakob Pöltl (15)
| Jones, Pöltl (6)
| AT&T Center18,354
| 12–24

|-  style="background:#fcc;"
| 37
| January 2
| @ Brooklyn
| 
| Keldon Johnson (22)
| Jakob Pöltl (11)
| Tre Jones (7)
| Barclays Center18,224
| 12–25
|-  style="background:#fcc;"
| 38
| January 4
| @ New York
| 
| Keldon Johnson (26)
| Jakob Pöltl (8)
| Tre Jones (6)
| Madison Square Garden19,812
| 12–26
|-  style="background:#cfc;"
| 39
| January 6
| Detroit
| 
| Tre Jones (25)
| Jakob Pöltl (16)
| Jakob Pöltl (7)
| AT&T Center13,107
| 13–26
|-  style="background:#fcc;"
| 40
| January 7
| Boston
| 
| Collins, Jones, Richardson (18)
| Zach Collins (12)
| Collins, Jones (5)
| AT&T Center18,354
| 13–27
|-  style="background:#fcc;"
| 41
| January 9
| @ Memphis
| 
| Tre Jones (18)
| Jakob Pöltl (7)
| Tre Jones (7)
| FedExForum16,013
| 13–28
|-  style="background:#fcc;"
| 42
| January 11
| @ Memphis
| 
| Keldon Johnson (24)
| Collins, Pöltl (12)
| Tre Jones (6)
| FedExForum16,454
| 13–29
|-  style="background:#fcc;"
| 43
| January 13
| Golden State
|  
| Tre Jones (21)
| Jakkob Pöltl (10)
| Jones, Pöltl, Richardson (5)
| Alamodome68,323
| 13–30
|-  style="background:#fcc;"
| 44
| January 15
| Sacramento
|  
| Jakob Pöltl (23)
| Jeremy Sochan (8)
| Tre Jones (8)
| AT&T Center12,339
| 13–31
|-  style="background:#cfc;"
| 45
| January 17
| Brooklyn
|  
| Keldon Johnson (36)
| Keldon Johnson (11)
| Tre Jones (5)
| AT&T Center13,532
| 14–31
|-  style="background:#fcc;"
| 46
| January 20
| L.A. Clippers
| 
| Keldon Johnson (23)
| Langford, Pöltl, Sochan (6)
| Tre Jones (8)
| AT&T Center15,190
| 14–32
|-  style="background:#fcc;"
| 47
| January 23
| @ Portland
| 
| Keldon Johnson (20)
| Jakob Pöltl (7)
| Tre Jones (7)
| Moda Center17,874
| 14–33
|-  style="background:#fcc;"
| 48
| January 25
| @ L.A. Lakers
| 
| Keldon Johnson (25)
| Jakob Pöltl (8)
| Tre Jones (6)
| Crypto.com Arena17,955
| 14–34
|-  style="background:#fcc;"
| 49
| January 26
| @ L.A. Clippers
| 
| Keldon Johnson (19)
| Zach Collins (10)
| Tre Jones (4)
| Crypto.com Arena16,958
| 14–35
|- style="background:#fcc;"
| 50
| January 28
| Phoenix
| 
| Keldon Johnson (34)
| Jakob Pöltl (13)
| Jakob Pöltl (6)
| AT&T Center18,354
| 14–36
|- style="background:#fcc;"
| 51
| January 30
| Washington
| 
| Keldon Johnson (26)
| Zach Collins (11)
| Tre Jones (9)
| AT&T Center11,970
| 14–37

|-  style="background:#fcc;"
| 52
| February 1
| Sacramento
| 
| Malaki Branham (22)
| Jakob Pöltl (12)
| Branham, Johnson (5)
| AT&T Center13,207
| 14–38
|-  style="background:#fcc;"
| 53
| February 3
| Philadelphia
| 
| Malaki Branham (26)
| Jakob Pöltl (10)
| Josh Richardson (7)
| AT&T Center15,252
| 14–39
|-  style="background:#fcc;"
| 54
| February 6
| @ Chicago
| 
| Keldon Johnson (21)
| Jakob Pöltl (9)
| Branham, Pöltl (4)
| United Center19,291
| 14–40
|-  style="background:#fcc;"
| 55
| February 8
| @ Toronto
| 
| Keldon Johnson (22)
| Johnson, Pöltl, Richardson (7)
| Blake Wesley (4)
| Scotiabank Arena19,800
| 14–41
|-  style="background:#fcc;"
| 56
| February 10
| @ Detroit
| 
| Devonte' Graham (31)
| Zach Collins (11)
| Keita Bates-Diop (5)
| Little Caesars Arena17,899
| 14–42
|-  style="background:#fcc;"
| 57
| February 11
| @ Atlanta
| 
| Keldon Johnson (25)
| Jeremy Sochan (9)
| Jeremy Sochan (5)
| State Farm Arena
| 14–43
|-  style="background:#fcc;"
| 58
| February 13
| @ Cleveland
| 
| Keldon Johnson (25)
| Charles Bassey (8)
| Devonte' Graham (8)
| Rocket Mortgage FieldHouse19,432
| 14–44
|-  style="background:#fcc;"
| 59
| February 15
| @ Charlotte
| 
| Malaki Branham (23)
| Zach Collins (12)
| Zach Collins (5)
| Spectrum Center14,155
| 14–45
|-  style="background:#fcc;"
| 60
| February 23
| @ Dallas
| 
| Malaki Branham (23)
| Zach Collins (12)
| Keldon Johnson (7)
| American Airlines Center20,287
| 14–46
|-  style="background:#fcc;"
| 61
| February 25
| @ Utah
| 
| Jeremy Sochan (22)
| Keldon Johnson (7)
| Bates-Diop, Graham, Wesley (4)
| Vivint Arena18,206
| 14–47
|-  style="background:#cfc;"
| 62
| February 28
| @ Utah
| 
| Keldon Johnson (25)
| Charles Bassey (10)
| Jeremy Sochan (6)
| Vivint Arena18,206
| 15–47

|-  style="background:#cfc;"
| 63
| March 2
| Indiana
| 
| Jeremy Sochan (22)
| Jeremy Sochan (13)
| Collins, Jones (5)
| AT&T Center14,617
| 16–47
|-  style="background:#fcc;"
| 64
| March 4
| Houston
| 
| Devonte' Graham (28)
| Zach Collins (10)
| Keita Bates-Diop (6)
| AT&T Center18,354
| 16–48
|-  style="background:#fcc;"
| 65
| March 5
| @ Houston
| 
| Keita Bates-Diop (17)
| Malaki Branham (7)
| Johnson, Vassell (5)
| Toyota Center16,721
| 16–49
|-  style="background:#cfc;"
| 66
| March 10
| Denver
| 
| Keldon Johnson (23)
| Zach Collins (9)
| Tre Jones (8)
| AT&T Center 18,354
| 17–49
|-  style="background:#fcc;"
| 67
| March 12
| Oklahoma City
| 
| Zach Collins (23)
| Zach Collins (11)
| Blake Wesley (6)
| AT&T Center 17,314
| 17–50 
|-  style="background:#cfc;"
| 68
| March 14
| Orlando
| 
| Jeremy Sochan (29)
| Jeremy Sochan (11)
| Devonte' Graham (9)
| AT&T Center 13,708
| 18–50
|-  style="background:#fcc;"
| 69
| March 15
| Dallas
| 
| Keldon Johnson (27)
| Keldon Johnson (8)
| Graham, Jones (5)
| AT&T Center18,354
| 18–51
|-  style="background:#fcc;"
| 70
| March 17
| Memphis
| 
| Malaki Branham (25)
| Sandro Mamukelashvili (14)
| Tre Jones (9)
| AT&T Center15,221
| 18–52
|-  style="background:#cfc;"
| 71
| March 19
| Atlanta
| 
| Johnson, Vassell (29)
| Keldon Johnson (12)
| Tre Jones (6)
| AT&T Center16,311
| 19–52
|-  style="background:#;"
| 72
| March 21
|
|
|
|
|
|
|
|-  style="background:#;"
| 73
| March 22
|
|
|
|
|
|
|
|-  style="background:#;"
| 74
| March 24
|
|
|
|
|
|
|
|-  style="background:#;"
| 75
| March 26
|
|
|
|
|
|
|
|-  style="background:#;"
| 76
| March 29
|
|
|
|
|
|
|
|-  style="background:#;"
| 77
| March 31
|
|
|
|
|
|
|

|-  style="background:#;"
| 78
| April 2
|
|
|
|
|
|
|
|-  style="background:#;"
| 79
| April 4
|
|
|
|
|
|
|
|-  style="background:#;"
| 80
| April 6
|
|
|
|
|
|
|
|-  style="background:#;"
| 81
| April 8
|
|
|
|
|
|
|
|-  style="background:#;"
| 82
| April 9
|
|
|
|
|
|
|

Transactions

Trades

Free agents

Additions

Subtractions

References

San Antonio Spurs seasons
San Antonio Spurs
San Antonio Spurs
San Antonio Spurs